Amt Gartz (Oder) is an Amt ("collective municipality") in the district of Uckermark, in Brandenburg, Germany. Its seat is in Gartz.

The Amt Gartz (Oder) consists of the following municipalities:
Casekow
Gartz
Hohenselchow-Groß Pinnow
Mescherin
Tantow

Demography 
About 2000 inhabitants are Polish.

References 

Gartz
Uckermark (district)